Clara Oswald is a fictional character in the British science fiction television series Doctor Who. She was created by series producer Steven Moffat and portrayed by Jenna Coleman. Clara was introduced in the seventh series as a new travelling companion of the series protagonist, the Doctor, in his eleventh and twelfth incarnations. Coleman received top billing alongside Matt Smith and Peter Capaldi for the duration of her time as a regular cast member. A featured actress in the series seven premiere, she became a regular for the second part of said series (2012), the 50th anniversary specials (2013), all of series eight (2014) and series nine (2015). Coleman also reappeared briefly in the 2017 Christmas special. This makes her one of the longest-serving companions in the show's history.
 
In the series' narrative, Clara is introduced in the seventh series as three distinct, though similarly named, people living in different eras. The first two incarnations, Oswin Oswald and Clara Oswin Oswald, each die during the episode in which they appear. The third incarnation, a nanny living in 21st century London, becomes the Doctor's companion, travelling with him for the remainder of the series as he tries to uncover the mystery of her multiple lives. She continues to travel with the Doctor after the mystery is resolved at the end of the series, witnessing him regenerate into his twelfth incarnation. At first unsure of the change the Doctor has gone through, she becomes accustomed to it and keeps traveling with him. Clara's actions and personality during this period become a reflection of the Doctor's, and both grow increasingly attached. This leads to her slowly abandoning her life on earth, and finally, to her demise, which the Doctor tries to stop through dangerous methods. In the series nine finale he is able to save Clara, at the expense of having his memories of her erased. 

In promoting the series, Coleman stressed Clara's curiosity and ability to hold her own against the Doctor whilst Moffat highlighted her speed and wit. Critical reaction noted that the character was far different from previous companion Amy Pond, whilst the character's first two incarnations were well received, critics thought her final one was more grounded and straightforward. Although her arc in her first season was criticized, the overall role in the narrative of the following series was praised. Coleman was nominated for numerous awards for her portrayal of Clara —including one for the BAFTA Cymru Awards —and since her initial role in the series, the character has ranked highly in numerous 'best companion' polls.

Appearances

Television
Oswin Oswald is introduced in the series 7 premiere, "Asylum of the Daleks" (2012). She is the sole survivor of the starship Alaska, which crashed on the Asylum, a prison planet for insane Daleks. Oswin then learns from the Eleventh Doctor (Matt Smith) that she has been converted from human into a Dalek and has coped by retreating into a fantasy of her own intact survival. She assists the Doctor and his travelling companions, Amy Pond (Karen Gillan) and Rory Williams (Arthur Darvill), to escape the planet unharmed, but at the cost of her own life. Later, in the 2012 Christmas special "The Snowmen", the Doctor meets a woman named Clara Oswin Oswald, whom he initially knows only as Clara. She is a Victorian barmaid and governess whom the Doctor invites to be his newest companion, but who dies from an attack by one of the Great Intelligence's minions. Seeing her full name on her tombstone and finally recognising her voice, the Doctor realises she is the same woman as Oswin from the Dalek Asylum, whom he had never seen in her human form. Intrigued by the mystery of the woman who has lived and died twice in different eras, he begins searching across time for another Clara.

In "The Bells of Saint John" (2013), Clara receives a phone number to the Doctor's time and space vessel, the TARDIS, from a mysterious woman. The Doctor finds Clara Oswald (this time with no middle name) in contemporary London through her phone call, and takes her on as a companion with a goal to solving the mystery of the "impossible girl". The Doctor's repeated attempts at investigating Clara's origins over the course of "The Rings of Akhaten", "Hide", and "Journey to the Centre of the TARDIS" consistently turn up compelling evidence that she is just a normal young human woman. In "Journey to the Centre of the TARDIS", the Doctor confronts Clara in an averted timeline about the two previous versions of her he had met, but she does not know what he is talking about. The mystery surrounding Clara is finally resolved in "The Name of the Doctor" when she sacrifices her existence by entering the Doctor's timestream to undo the harm caused by the Great Intelligence (Richard E Grant). This results in the creation of numerous incarnations of Clara throughout the Doctor's history who appear to every known face of the Doctor, saving his life in numerous ways. Very few Claras are noticed by the Doctor. One version of Clara successfully persuades the First Doctor (William Hartnell) to pick the "right" TARDIS on his home planet Gallifrey, prior to the events of the show's first episode. Lost in the Doctor's timestream, she is eventually rescued and brought back into existence by the Eleventh Doctor. In "The Day of the Doctor", the show's 50th anniversary special, Clara is shown to have become a teacher at Coal Hill School. While on an adventure with the Doctor, she meets the Tenth Doctor (David Tennant) and the War Doctor (John Hurt) in person.  She manages to convince the War Doctor to change his history (and thereby save Gallifrey and his people, the Time Lords, from destruction in the Time War), by sealing the planet in a "parallel pocket universe", where it remains.

In "The Time of the Doctor", the Time Lords try to return to the universe through a crack in time, but if they do so, the Time War will begin anew. The Doctor sends Clara home to her family at Christmas twice while the Doctor stays on the planet Trenzalore to try and prevent this war, but she returns in the TARDIS each time, after two centuries-long intervals. With the Doctor facing certain death at the end of his regeneration cycle during this siege, she pleads with the Time Lords through the crack to save the Doctor; they grant him a new regeneration cycle and the crack closes. She then witnesses the Doctor regenerate into the Twelfth Doctor (Peter Capaldi). Clara spends some time grappling with losing the Doctor she knew and loved throughout the events of "Deep Breath" (2014), even considering refusing to travel with him as he was no longer the man she used to know, until a call from the Eleventh Doctor prior to his regeneration convinces her to stay by his side and help him adjust to his new persona. In "Into the Dalek", Clara and fellow teacher Danny Pink (Samuel Anderson) agree to go for drinks together, and over the course of the episodes "Listen", "Time Heist", and "The Caretaker", the two enter into a romantic relationship. For a while, she keeps secrets between the Doctor and Danny due to their misgivings about each other, and experiences turbulence in her friendship with the Doctor, particularly in "Kill the Moon", when he abandons her to face a traumatic decision on her own. In "Flatline", she is forced to take the Doctor's role in averting an alien invasion, and realises she is capable of making the same ruthless and pragmatic decisions he often has to make. In "Dark Water", Danny dies while crossing the road before Clara can announce her intent to commit to him fully. After attempting to blackmail the Doctor into changing history to avert his death, which is impossible, Clara and the Doctor decide to pursue contacting him from beyond the grave, and end up at a facility where evil Time Lord Missy (Michelle Gomez) has stored the consciousnesses of Earth's dead as part of a plot to convert all of the deceased into an army of Cybermen. In "Death in Heaven", Missy reveals that she was the aforementioned woman who gave Clara the TARDIS telephone number and had also been secretly keeping the two together after their first meeting as part of her plan. After Danny is brought back as a Cyberman in the episode, he resists his programming in order to destroy Missy's Cyberman army and avert her plans. Two weeks after these events, Clara and the Doctor meet to say goodbye to one another. The Doctor lies to Clara; he pretends he has found Gallifrey and a home to go back to. Clara lies too; she pretends Danny returned from the dead through Missy's device, when in fact he sacrificed his opportunity, to save the life of the child he killed in the Afghanistan war.

The two later reunite in the 2014 Christmas special "Last Christmas", when alien creatures induce a dream state in both the Doctor and Clara. Clara confesses that Danny is still dead, and the Doctor admits he did not find Gallifrey. Their shared dream experience on the North Pole ends with them regretting their parting. The Doctor asks Clara to resume travelling with him, and she happily agrees. In series 9, Clara accompanies  Missy and the Doctor to Skaro when he is summoned by Davros (Julian Bleach), barely escaping the ordeal with her life. Now an experienced companion, Clara shows greater confidence when dealing with alien races and volatile humans, but the Doctor finds himself concerned by her reckless streak. Clara's recklessness gets the better of her in "Face the Raven", when she attempts to outsmart the Doctor's adversary Ashildr (Maisie Williams) by taking on a death sentence, but later learns that it cannot be revoked. She cautions the Doctor not to give in to his darker nature in response to her passing, and faces death with bravery. She is seen once more in the following episode "Heaven Sent", as a grief-stricken Doctor imagines conversations with her to clarify his ideas. In "Hell Bent", the Doctor uses Time Lord technology on Gallifrey to extract Clara from her last moments of life, and attempts to run away with her and cheat death. When this fails, they go to the extreme end of the universe. The Doctor finds the immortal human Ashildr waiting in the ruins of Gallifrey. Ashildr theorises that the Doctor and Clara together are the Hybrid. Since they are so alike, each pushes the other to potentially catastrophic actions.  He later realizes from Ashildr that traveling together will only cause more harm than good, and prepares to wipe Clara's memories of him with a device. Clara tampers with the device so that it wipes the Doctor's memories of her instead. She leaves the Doctor on Earth to start his adventures anew, and begins traveling with Ashildr in a stolen TARDIS with the intention of one day returning to Gallifrey to meet her end, although vowing to "take the long way around".

In "Twice Upon a Time", the Doctor encounters Testimony, a futuristic organisation who use time travel to copy people's memories at the moment of death and install them in sentient glass avatars. At the end of an adventure, an avatar of Bill Potts restores the Doctor's memories of Clara with a mental image of her telling him not to forget her again.

Other media
Clara (Sophie Downham) appears in a short prelude to "The Bells of Saint John" as a child who talks to the Doctor at a playground. The Doctor does not realise her identity, which is revealed to the viewer. Coleman also played Clara in "She Said, He Said", an online prelude to "The Name of the Doctor" that breaks the fourth wall. The DVD and Blu-ray releases for Series 7 also include Coleman in a solo performance as Clara in the home media-exclusive short "Clara and the TARDIS".

Literature
Clara also features alongside the Eleventh Doctor in the New Series Adventures novel Shroud of Sorrow (2013). From 2014, she has been featured in the Twelfth Doctor novels including: The Blood Cell, Silhouette, The Crawling Terror, and as of 2015, Royal Blood and Deep Time. She appeared in IDW Publishing's comic story "Deadwood". Clara appeared briefly in issues 11 and 12 of IDW 50th anniversary Doctor Who mini-series "Prisoners of Time". Beginning with Issue #462 (August 2013), Clara appears regularly in the Doctor Who Magazine comic strips. In the 2015 Doctor Who Magazine comic storyline Blood and Ice (DWM #485–488), Clara meets another incarnation of herself she created called "Winnie Clarence", a university research graduate from the year 2048.

Video games
Clara Oswald appears in the toys-to-life game Lego Dimensions. She appears as an “In Peril” character where the player has to solve a puzzle to rescue her. Her only appearances in levels are “A Dalektable Adventure”, and “The Dalek Extermination of Earth”.

Development

Casting

On 21 March 2012, it was announced that Jenna Coleman would replace Karen Gillan and Arthur Darvill as the next companion. She auditioned for the role in secrecy, pretending it was for something called Men on Waves, an anagram for "Woman Seven". Executive producer and lead writer Steven Moffat chose her for the role because she worked the best alongside Smith and could talk faster than he did. Coleman had never seen Doctor Who before her audition, and watched "The Eleventh Hour" (2010) and "completely fell in love with the show". However, she only watched the first five episodes of the seventh series – the final five featuring Gillan and Darvill – because she did not want to learn more about their relationship to the Doctor, as she wanted her acting alongside Smith to be "spontaneous". Moffat stated that her character is different from previous companions, though he attempted to keep the details of her character a secret until she debuted in the Christmas special. In "Asylum of the Daleks" (2012), Coleman appears as the character Oswin Oswald, a secret which was kept from the public before transmission. Coleman was originally given the role of a Victorian governess named Jasmine, and then for the second audition she was given both the characters of Oswin and Clara. She originally thought that the producers were looking for the right character, but later realised it was part of Moffat's "soft mystery" plan. Neil Gaiman (writer of "Nightmare in Silver", 2013) revealed that the character was originally intended to stay as a Victorian governess. Coleman stated that Moffat came up with the mystery during the audition process. Coleman played each version of the character as individuals with "trust that there would be a payoff" to her mystery. Moffat told Neil Cross, who wrote "Hide" (2013), the first episode Coleman filmed as the new companion, that Clara was "a normal girl". 

It was widely expected that Coleman would leave the show at the end of 2014. Moffat has confirmed in numerous interviews that he wrote the character out twice — once for the end of Series 8 and again for the 2014 Christmas special — but ultimately convinced Coleman to stay on for one more series. Moffat didn't feel that the show was "quite finished with Jenna and Clara", and wasn't convinced Coleman was ready to said goodbye either, "I don’t think anyone should leave Doctor Who until they’re really ready to leave." On 18 September 2015, Coleman officially announced on BBC Radio 1 that she would leave the show at the end of the ninth series. One of the reasons for her departure was her casting as Queen Victoria, in the ITV drama series Victoria.

Characterisation
Moffat felt that the introduction of a new companion made "the show feel different" and brought the story to "a new beginning" with a different person meeting the Doctor. Executive producer Caroline Skinner remarked that her introduction allowed the series to return to a more "classic Doctor Who format". Smith said that Clara was different from her predecessor Amy Pond (Gillan), which allowed the audience to see a different side of the Doctor. Moffat said that Coleman brings "a speed and wit and an unimpressed quality that makes the Doctor dance a bit harder". Coleman stated that her character "holds her own" and was competitive with the Doctor, providing "a nice double act". With her place in the series' narrative, Clara was intended to reawaken the Doctor's "curiosity in the universe and gives him his mojo back". Concerning Clara's relationship to the Doctor, Coleman said, "It's been interesting how it's changed Matt's Doctor. There is a natural bounce between them, and a flirtation, and attraction. But, again, they've always got this friction because they're a bit magnetic and drawn to each other, but she can't quite figure him out. He's got loads of secrets and he's always looking at her, trying to figure her out." The dynamic between Katharine Hepburn and Spencer Tracy was an influence on Coleman and Smith. In addition, Coleman revealed that Clara and the TARDIS have a "relationship", as there is a running joke about the TARDIS (previously established in the series as being sentient) not liking Clara or making fun of her.

Many fans and critics noticed similarities between Clara and Billie Piper's Rose Tyler. Clara helps the Doctor recover at a dark point in his life, as Rose does during a much darker time; both companions lose a parent; each has a close relationship with the Doctor, who sees part of their childhood. The Doctor does the same thing to Clara in "The Time of the Doctor" (2013) as he does to Rose in "The Parting of the Ways" (2005) by sending her back home to keep her safe.

Reprisal
Coleman reprised the role of Clara for a cameo appearance in the 2017 Christmas Special "Twice Upon a Time". Early drafts of the script had Coleman appear alongside fellow companions Nardole and Bill Potts with all three characters interacting together. This idea had to be reworked, as Coleman's shooting schedule for Victoria didn't allow for it, instead she had to film her scenes in front of a green screen at the offices of the BBC Television Centre, days after filming wrapped. The episode's director Rachel Talalay described the story as being "about memories" and praised Moffat for being able to weave Clara into it: "The fact that the Doctor, having lost his memories of her, got them back in the Christmas episode, I just felt was so brilliant."

Reception

Nick Setchfield of SFX praised the effective surprise debut of Coleman as Oswin in "Asylum of the Daleks". He wrote, "Coleman brings sauce and sparkiness, and while she initially seems a familiar Moffat archetype, all snarky cracks about the Doctor's chin and throwaway lines about sexual experimentation... there's a deeper vulnerability there too, which makes her eventual fate in this episode genuinely heart-skewering." Michael Hogan, writing for The Daily Telegraph, also found her debut promising and described her as "enchanting in an elfin way – rather like a brunette, curvier, less annoying Fearne Cotton".

The character's reintroduction as Clara in "The Snowmen" received generally positive reviews from critics. The Guardian's Dan Martin wrote, "The masterstroke behind Jenna-Louise Coleman's surprise introduction is that it made us want to see more of her before Karen Gillan had even gone. The cheeky, self-assured Clara won a place in our hearts from the off." Setchfield called her "less of a motormouthed quip-merchant than [Oswin], but Coleman makes her equally winning – plucky, smart and riffing on a very promising chemistry with Matt Smith". IGN's Matt Risley felt that Clara "trumped her already-bombastic debut with a character both fully formed and utterly unpredictable". He praised the mystery surrounding her and her independence, commenting that she seemed to be the "antithesis" of Amy Pond as she was "a girl who will wait for no-one". Radio Times reviewer Patrick Mulkern admitted that he had "found Oswin's perkiness a tad wearing", but he was "completely won over" by Coleman's Clara in "The Snowmen". Neela Debanth of The Independent felt that Clara's demise in "The Snowmen" made the episode "a bit of a tease" and set up the question of what the travelling Clara would be like. Unlike Mulkern, she favoured the Oswin version, describing her as "much more fun and flirtatious".

Following "The Bells of Saint John", Digital Spy's Morgan Jeffery said that the new Clara was "more grounded and so far easier for the viewer to latch on to" than her two predecessors, both of whom could have been harder to sustain as companions. Mulkern said that he did not bother with the character's mystery and found it pleasing that Coleman played her as "a straightforward modern companion with no baggage". Setchfield described Clara as "equally sparky and winning but altogether younger and possibly just a tad more vulnerable than her previous incarnations" with a "helplessly watchable chemistry" with Smith. Debnath described her as a "softer version" of Oswin, still hoping that "the character will be taken up a notch, challenging the Doctor more and bouncing off him like Oswin did. However, the Daily Mirror's Jon Cooper expressed concern that Clara, despite Coleman's success, was too similar to Amy. Mike Higgins of The Independent felt that Coleman was "an improvement" upon Gillan, but wrote that "the pairing of an intellectually bright but emotionally dim male with a techno-illiterate but wised up female is a tired old trope of much drama and comedy".

The character's development has also been met with positive reviews. Martin praised how her backstory was fleshed out in "The Rings of Akhaten", as otherwise the character "was danger of becoming simply a story arc in the shape of a girl".  SFX's Richard Edwards wrote that she had the potential to be "a truly great companion", and that it was "refreshing to see a companion who isn't in total awe of the Doctor... and she's not afraid to take the lead when she needs to". Debnath praised her "caring nature" and "lovely maternal side", but felt that she could be "annoyingly naïve". Dave Golder of SFX stated that Clara was "to an extent, a bit of a cartoon character" and that Moffat was better at writing her in "The Name of the Doctor" than some of the preceding writers. He also commented that she "still feels too new a companion (and an underdeveloped one) to really care about her sacrifice".

References

External links

Clara  at BBC America's Doctor Who website

Doctor Who companions
Female characters in television
Television characters introduced in 2012
Fictional nannies
Fictional hackers
Fictional governesses
Fictional schoolteachers
Fictional people from the 21st-century